Charles "Charlie" Gary Vernon is the bass trombonist for the Chicago Symphony Orchestra and serves as professor of trombone at DePaul University in Chicago, Illinois.

Education
A native of Asheville, North Carolina, Vernon attended Brevard College and Georgia State University. His principal teachers were bass trombonist Edward Kleinhammer and tubist Arnold Jacobs, both former members of the Chicago Symphony Orchestra.

Previous positions
Vernon joined the CSO in 1986, coming from the Philadelphia Orchestra, where he had served since 1981. Prior to that, Vernon held identical posts with the Baltimore Symphony from 1971 to 1980 and the San Francisco Symphony from 1980 to 1981. Vernon is also a former faculty member of The Catholic University of America, Temple University, New School of Philadelphia, the Philadelphia College of Performing Arts (now University of the Arts (Philadelphia)), and the Curtis Institute of Music.

Current
Vernon is a clinician for the Selmer Instrument Company and a frequent guest artist for the International Trombone Association, and has made numerous appearances as a soloist throughout the world. In April 1991, with the CSO under Daniel Barenboim, he gave the world premiere of Ellen Taaffe Zwilich's Concerto for Bass Trombone, which was commissioned by the CSO for its centennial. In 2006, Vernon and the CSO premiered "Chick 'a' Bone Checkout" a new concerto for alto, tenor and bass trombone and orchestra, written by trombonist and composer Christian Lindberg.

As a part-time athlete, Vernon is an avid swimmer and is a member of the Evanston Masters Swim Team. He states that "as time passes, I realize that I must keep doing it, so that I can keep doing it!"

External links

 Atlanta Brass Society Press, Vernon's music publisher
Dutch Bass Trombone open 2012 featuring Charlie Vernon, international Basstrombone festival
Charles Vernon biography at cso.org

Year of birth missing (living people)
Living people
Brevard College alumni
Georgia State University alumni
DePaul University faculty
University of the Arts (Philadelphia) faculty
Curtis Institute of Music faculty
Temple University faculty
Catholic University of America faculty
American classical trombonists
Male trombonists
21st-century classical trombonists
21st-century American male musicians